We Are (stylized in all caps) is the sixth studio album by Jon Batiste. It was released on Verve Records on March 19, 2021. In April 2022, the album won Album of the Year at the 64th Annual Grammy Awards; it earned Batiste eleven nominations in total, with five wins.

Following the 64th Annual Grammy Awards, We Are reached its peak at number 25 on the US Billboard 200 with 18,000 album equivalent units.

Background
Batiste began working on the album in late 2019, making it in his dressing room over six days in September and finishing it by mid-2020. While largely written and recorded prior to the events of 2020, the album's lyrical and thematic content reflects such events as the onset of the COVID-19 pandemic and his involvement in 2020, leading Black Lives Matter protests in New York after the killings of George Floyd and Breonna Taylor.

On June 12, 2020, he released the single "We Are", featuring the band from his New Orleans alma mater, the St. Augustine High School Marching 100.

As part of Record Store Day 2020, Batiste released a limited edition EP titled We Are: Roots & Traditions.

The album also features Mavis Staples, Zadie Smith, PJ Morton, and Trombone Shorty.

Speaking to Atwood Magazine, Batiste described We Are as "a representation of genreless music that's just about the story" and "a culmination of my life to this point".

Batiste released a deluxe edition of the album on October 15, 2021.

Awards and nominations 
Grammy Awards

Track listing

Personnel

Musicians

Technical
 Russell Elevado – recording
 Misha Kachkachishvili – recording
 Kizzo – composer, producer, recording
 Michelle Mancini – mastering engineer
 Manny Marroquin – mixing
 Marc Whitmore – recording, mixing
 Alex Williams – recording
 Karla Cordova – album art
 Suleika Jaouad – photography
 Quincy Jones – liner notes
 Ricky Reed – mixing
 Ryan Lynn – co executive producer
 John Muller – engineer
 Gavin Paddock - engineer, mix engineer 
 David Andersen - second engineer

Charts

Weekly charts

Year-end charts

References

2021 albums
Verve Records albums
Jon Batiste albums
Grammy Award for Album of the Year